Garik (also Romanized as Garīk) is a village in Heruz Rural District, Kuhsaran District, Ravar County, Kerman Province, Iran. At the 2006 census, its population was 192, in 52 families.

References 

Populated places in Ravar County